Plasmodium cyclopsi is a parasite of the genus Plasmodium subgenus Vinckeia.

Like all Plasmodium species P. cyclopsi has both vertebrate and insect hosts. The vertebrate hosts for this parasite are mammals.

Taxonomy 
The parasite was first described by Landau and Chabaud in 1978.

Distribution 
This species was described in Gabon.

Hosts 
The only known host species for this parasite is the cyclops roundleaf bat (Hipposideros cyclops).

References 

cyclopsi
Taxa named by Alain Chabaud